HMS Assistance was one of six 40-gun fourth-rate frigates, built for the Commonwealth of England under the 1650 Programme, after the Restoration of the monarchy in 1660 she was incorporated into the navy of the Kingdom of England. During her time in the Commonwealth Navy she partook in the First Anglo-Dutch war being present in the battles of Kentish Knock, Portland and The Gabbard. In the Mediterranean she was present at the Battle of Santa Cruz and the bombardment of Porto Farina, In the Second Anglo-Dutch War she was involved in the Battle of Lowestoft, Battle of Vagen and the St James Day Fight. She did not participate in fleet actions after this. She spent the rest of her service life undergoing several rebuilds and plying the waters as a cruiser protecting British trade and projecting British sovereignty. After nearly 95 years of Service she was sunk as a break water at Sheerness at the end of 1745.

Assistance was the first named vessel in the English and Royal Navy.

Construction and specifications
She was ordered in December 1649 to be built under contract at Deptford under the guidance of Master Shipwright Henry Johnson. She was launched in 1650. Her tonnage was  tons. Her tonnage was 567 tons.

Her gun armament in 1653 was 40 guns. In 1666 her armament was 46 guns and consisted of twenty-two culverins on the lower deck (LD), twenty demi-culverins on the upper deck, four sakers on the quarterdeck (QD). In 1677 she had 2 more sakers added bringing her gun total to 48 guns. In 1685 her guns were established at 50 guns. She now carried twenty-two culverins, twenty-two demi-culverins and six sakers. Her manning was 180 personnel in 1653 and 170 in 1666.

She was completed with a first cost of £3,386.10.0d or 522 tons @ £6.10.0d per ton.

Commissioned service

Service in the Commonwealth Navy
She was commissioned in 1650 under the command of Captain John Bourne for service at the Downs and the east coast of England.

First Anglo-Dutch War
England declared war on 30 June 1652. Her first battle was the Battle of Kentish Knock where she was a member of Rear-Admiral Nehemiah Bourne's Squadron on 28 September 1652. Her next fight was at the Battle of Portland on 18 February 1653 as Flagship of Rear Admiral John Bourne, Rear-Admiral of the Blue. She was taken briefly by the Dutch but was quickly recaptured. Later in 1653 she was under command of Captain William Crispin. She was at the Battle of the Gabbard as a member White Squadron, Center Division on 2–3 June 1653. Her last battle of the war was the Battle of Scheveningen off Texel as a member White Squadron, Center Division on 31 July 1653. She then spent the winter of 1653/54 in the Western Approaches. on 5 (or 8) April 1654 the war was concluded with the 1st Treaty of Westminster.

In 1654 she was under the command of Captain Thomas Sparling until 1660. In 1659 she was on operations in the Sound.

Service after the Restoration May 1660
On 20 May 1661 she was Captain Edward Wye With the Earl of Sandwich's Squadron in the Straits. On 10 April 1662 Captain William Berkeley took over after the death of Captain Wye on the 9th. Captain Zachary Brown took command on 15 September 1664.

Second Anglo-Dutch War
She partook in the Battle of Lowestoft as a Blue Squadron, Rear Division on 3 June 1665. One year later she partook in the Four Days' Battle as a Blue Squadron, Van Division from 1 to 4 June 1666. On 25 July 1666 as a member White Squadron, Center Division she participated in the St James Day Battle. She sailed with Rear-Admiral Sir John Harmon's Squadron for the West Indies. She was involved in the attack on Martinique on 24/25 June 1667. The Second Anglo-Dutch war ended on 31 July 1667.

On 1 January 1671 Captain John Hubbard II took command. she was in action against the Algerines resulting in the death of Captain Hubbard on 19 July 1671. On 20 August 1871 Captain John Wilgress took over until his death on 9 September 1671, then in 1672 Captain Ralph Lesselles (possibly). Captain Richard Munden held command from 7 January 1673 until 7 November 1674. During his command she was at the recapture of St Helena in May 1673. She returned to Home Waters in late 1674. On 15 May 1675 she was under Captain William Houlding with Narborough's Squadron in the Mediterranean. Captain Thomas Gardner held command from 5 November 1677 until his death on 13 April 1679. During this time she was in the English Channel and later moved to the Mediterranean. On 13 June 1679 she was under Captain James Barber until 4 December 1679. From 18 May 1680 until 27 July 1682 Captain Sir Robert Robinson held command for service in Newfoundland. In 1687 she was taken in hand for a rebuilt at Deptford.

Rebuild at Deptford 1687
She was rebuilt by Robert & John Castle of Deptford in 1687. She was floated out of dock in late 1687. Her tonnage was  tons.

Her gun armament in 1688 was 40 guns and consisted of twenty culverins (drakes) on the lower deck (LD), eighteen demi-culverines on the upper deck, four saker cutts on the quarterdeck (QD). Under a 1696 survey her guns were 46 guns. She now carried seventeen culverins, twenty-one demi-culverins and eight sakers.

Service after 1687 Rebuild
She was commissioned in July 1687 under Captain Lawrence Wright until 1689. In 1690 she was under Captain Richard Keigwin in the West Indies. Captain Keigwin died on 21 June 1690. She was under Captain Francis Maynard through 1691/92. in 1693 Captain Phineas Bowles took command for a Newfoundland convoy. Captain Edward Littlejohn took command in 1694 for the English Channel and cruising. During 1695/96 she was under Captain Thomas Robinson for service in the North Sea. Captain James Davidson in 1697 escorted a convoy to Iceland. In 1700 she was taken in hand for a rebuilt at Deptford.

Rebuild at Deptford Dockyard 1699
She was ordered on 29 April 1699 to be rebuilt at Deptford Dockyard under the guidance of Master Shipwright Samuel Miller. She was floated out of dock in 1699. Her tonnage was  tons.

Her gun armament in accordance with the 1703 establishment was 48 guns and consisted of twenty/eighteen 12-pounder guns on the lower deck (LD), twenty/eighteen 6-pounder guns on the upper deck, four 6-pounder guns on the quarterdeck (QD) and two 6-pounder guns on the Foc'x'le (Fc).

Service after 1699 Rebuild
She was commissioned in 1701 under the command of Captain John Graydon. In 1702 she was under Captain Robert Arris and sailed with Commodore John Leake's squadron to Newfoundland at the outbreak of the War of the Spanish Succession.  Commodore Leake sent her to destroy the fortifications of the isle of Saint Pierre. Captain John Edwards was in command between 1703 and 1705. She was in the North Sea in 1705. From 1706 to 1707 she went to Jamaica under the command of Captain Barrow Harris. In July 1708 she was under Captain Caesar Brooks. 1709 she had a new commander, Captain Abraham Tudor until he was killed in action against Duguay-Trouin's Squadron on 2 March 1709. Later in the year she was commanded by Captain William Gray. In 1712 she was sent to Limehouse for another rebuilding.

Rebuild at Limehouse 1712
She was ordered on 15 October 1710 to be rebuilt by William Johnson of Limehouse on the River Thames. Her keel was laid on 23 June 1710 and launched on 16 February 1713. She was completed around March 1713 at Deptford Dockyard. Her tonnage was  tons.

Her gun armament in accordance with the 1706 establishment was 50 guns and consisted of twenty-two/eighteen 12-pounder guns on the lower deck (LD), twenty-two/eighteen 6-pounder guns on the upper deck, 8/6 6-pounder guns on the quarterdeck (QD) and two 6-pounder guns on the Foc'x'le (Fc).

Service after 1713 Rebuild
She was commissioned in 1714 under the command of Captain Edward Vernon for Norris's Fleet in the Baltic. During the Winter of 1716/17 she took Ambassador to Turkey. In 1719 she was under the command of Captain Edward Holland for service with Norris's Fleet in the Baltic. On her return she was sent to Woolwich to be dismantled for rebuilding.

Rebuild at Woolwich Dockyard 1720-25
She was ordered on 27 January 1720 to be rebuilt at Woolwich Dockyard under the guidance of Master Shipwright John Hayward. Her keel was laid in January 1721 and launched on 25 November 1725. She was completed for sea on 9 March 1726. Her tonnage was  tons.

Her gun armament in accordance with the 1706 establishment was 50 guns and consisted of twenty-two 18-pounder guns on the lower deck (LD), twenty-two 9-pounder guns on the upper deck, four 6-pounder guns on the quarterdeck (QD) and two 6-pounder guns on the Foc'x'le (Fc).

Service after 1720-25 Rebuild
She was commissioned in 1726 under the command of Captain Nicholas Eaton for Wager's Fleet in the Baltic. Later in the fall she was under Captain George Proctor with Wager's Fleet in the Straits of Gibraltar in 1727. She was fitted as a guardship in 1728. In 1728 she was under Captain Thomas Graves as guardship a Plymouth from 1728 through 1730. During 1729 she was prepared for service in the Mediterranean. She underwent a small repair at a cost of 1,850.10.2d at Plymouth from May to June 1732. She recommissioned in 1738 under Captain John Wynnell for service in Home Waters. In 1740 she was under Captain John Russel with Haddock's Fleet in the Mediterranean in March 1740 then Norris's Fleet from July to September 1740. Captain Roger Martin took command in 1741 for service with Norris's Fleet in 1741. She went to Jamaica under Captain Smith Callis in 1742. She was at La Guayra on 18 February 1743 and at Porto Cabello on the 16th and 24 April 1744. She was ordered Home to pay off in 1745.

Disposition
After nearly 95 years of service she sunk as a breakwater at Sheerness by Admiralty Order (AO) 10 January 1746 on 14 December 1745

Notes

Citations

References

 Lavery, Brian (2003) The Ship of the Line - Volume 1: The development of the battlefleet 1650-1850. Conway Maritime Press. .
 British Warships in the Age of Sail (1603 – 1714), by Rif Winfield, published by Seaforth Publishing, England © Rif Winfield 2009, EPUB : 
 Chapter 4, The Fourth Rates - 'Small Ships', Vessels acquired from 24 March 1603, 1650 Programme, Assistance
 Fleet Actions, 1.3 Battle of Kentish Knock
 Fleet Actions, 1.5 Battle of Portland
 Fleet Actions, 1.7 Battle of the Gabbard (North Foreland)
 Fleet Actions, 1.8 Battle of Scheveningen (off Texel)
 Fleet Actions 3.1 Battle of Lowestoft
 Fleet Actions 3.3 Battle of the Galloper Sand ('the Four Days' Battle')
 Fleet Actions, 3.4 Battle of Orfordness ('the St James Day Battle')
 Fleet Actions, 3.8 Battle of Martinique
 Chapter 4, The Fourth Rates - 'Small Ships', Vessels acquired from 2 May 1660, Rebuilt Vessels (1681-87), Assistance
 Chapter 4, The Fourth Rates - 'Small Ships', Vessels acquired from 18 December 1688, Fourth Rates of 50 guns, Inter-War (1697-1702) Rebuilding Programme, 48-gun Type, Assistance
 Chapter 4, The Fourth Rates - 'Small Ships', Vessels acquired from 18 December 1688, 1706 Establishment Group, Assistance
 British Warships in the Age of Sail (1714 – 1792), by Rif Winfield, published by Seaforth Publishing, England © Rif Winfield 2007, EPUB , Chapter 4, Fourth Rates, Ships of 50 guns, 1719 Establishment Group, Assistance
 Ships of the Royal Navy, by J.J. Colledge, revised and updated by Lt-Cdr Ben Warlow and Steve Bush, published by Seaforth Publishing, Barnsley, Great Britain, © the estate of J.J. Colledge, Ben Warlow and Steve Bush 2020, EPUB , Section A (Assistance)
 The Arming and Fitting of English Ships of War 1600 - 1815, by Brian Lavery, published by US Naval Institute Press © Brian Lavery 1989, Part V Guns, Type of Guns

Ships of the line of the Royal Navy
1650s ships
Ships sunk as breakwaters